General elections will be held in Saint Lucia in or before 2026 to elect all 17 members of the House of Assembly.

Background
The Saint Lucia Labour Party won a landslide victory in the 2021 elections, winning 13 of the 17 seats in the House of Assembly, resulting in Philip J. Pierre becoming Prime Minister. The United Workers Party led by Allen Chastanet was reduced from eleven to two seats, while independents won the remaining two seats.

Electoral system
The 17 elected members of the House of Assembly are elected by first-past-the-post in single member constituencies.

According to the constitution, elections for a new Parliament session can be held at the latest five years and 90 days after the opening of the previous session. The first session after the 2021 election was held on 17 August 2021, leaving the deadline for the next elections as November 2026.

References

Future elections in the Caribbean
Elections in Saint Lucia